Matej Krasniqi (1763 - 1827 or 1829 ), also referred as Matteo Granisch or Matthaeus Crasnich, was an Albanian Catholic cleric, who served as Archbishop of the Roman Catholic Diocese of Skopje from 8 March 1816 to 1829.

He was born in Prizren on 11 January 1763. He was appointed Archbishop of Dicese of Skopje on 8 March 1816, and ordained bishop on 22 September the same year. He died in 1827 or 1829.

See also
 Krasniqi

References

19th-century Albanian Roman Catholic priests
18th-century Albanian Roman Catholic priests
19th-century Roman Catholic archbishops in the Ottoman Empire
Albanian Roman Catholic archbishops
1829 deaths
1763 births
1827 deaths
People from Prizren
Bishops of Skopje